J'ai rencontré le Père Noël is a 1984 French musical science fiction  fantasy film directed by Christian Gion and co-written with Didier Kaminka. It stars Karen Cheryl, who was a popular singer at that time in France, as both the schoolteacher and as the Fairy. She acts and sings musical numbers in the film, an opportunity for Cheryl to repeatedly sing simple melodies, in line with the plot.

Plot
Simon is a young boy, bullied at school by peers and adults alike. His parents have been kidnapped in Africa, and the government has not responded to the ultimatum set by the kidnappers. Therefore, while on a field trip to the local airport, Simon and his friend Élodie sneak onto a jet liner and fly to Rovaniemi to visit Santa Claus in Lapland, to ask him to save Simon's parents. On the way, they encounter a fairy and an ogre.

The two children arrive safely to travel to Lapland then Santa and the fairy teleport to Africa near the village where the parents are inmates, and finally the two children returned home and rushed to the Christmas Mass where no one seems really surprised they reappear after their prolonged absence.

Cast
 Karen Cheryl as Schoolteacher / Fairy
 Nathalie Simard provided the Quebec Version dub for Cheryl’s role.
 Armand Meffre as Le Père Noël
 Emeric Chapuis as Simon
 Chris Davenport provided the English dub for Simon.
 Alexia Haudot (credited as Little Alexia) as Élodie
 Jeanne Herviale as Simon's grandmother
 Dominique Hulin as Ogre
 Hélène Ruby as Simon's mother
 Jean-Louis Foulquier as Simon's father
 Baye Fall as Bouake

Soundtrack
The musical score is composed by Francis Lai, with lyrics by Pierre-Andre Dousset. A soundtrack was released on LP (WEA 74320 06) on 7 June 1984. The first edition was recalled due to Karen Cheryl having not asked permission from her producer (Ibach) to appear in the film or sing for the soundtrack. The disc was reissued with the same cover but with singer Tilda (then Tilda Rejwan) in Cheryl's place. In Quebec, Nathalie Simard dubbed over the songs.

Release
The film was dubbed in English by New World Pictures and retitled as Here Comes Santa Claus. It has also been released on DVD by Image Entertainment under the title I Believe in Santa Claus. It is also available on Amazon Prime for free.

Legacy
The film, credited as I Believe in Santa Claus, saw re-release as a video on demand title with comedic commentary by RiffTrax, the alumni project of former Mystery Science Theater 3000 members Michael J. Nelson, Kevin Murphy and Bill Corbett.

See also
 List of Christmas films
 Santa Claus in film

References

External links
 
 
 AllMovie

1984 films
Films set in Lapland
Films set in Africa
French children's films
French Christmas films
Santa Claus in film
French aviation films
French musical films
1980s rediscovered films
Rediscovered French films
1980s French films